68 Draconis is the Flamsteed designation for a star in the northern circumpolar constellation of Draco. It has an apparent visual magnitude of 5.69, so, according to the Bortle scale, it is faintly visible to the naked eye from suburban skies at night. It is moving closer to the Earth with a heliocentric radial velocity of –14.6 km/s.

The stellar classification of 68 Draconis is F5 V, indicating that it is a main sequence star that is fusing hydrogen into helium at its core to generate energy. The star appears to be over-luminous for a member of its class, being 0.73 magnitudes brighter than expected. This may indicate that this is a binary system with an unresolved secondary component. It has 15% more mass than the Sun but is less than half as old, with an estimated age of 1.7 billion years. The star is radiating 11 times the Sun's luminosity from its photosphere at an effective temperature of 6,137 K, giving it the yellow-white hue of an F-type star.

References

F-type main-sequence stars
Draco (constellation)
7727
BD+61 1983
Draconis, 68
192455
099500